Maldives competed at the 2020 Summer Paralympics in Tokyo, Japan, from 24 August to 5 September 2021. This was the country's debut appearance at the Paralympics.

Athletics 

Track

See also
 Maldives at the 2020 Summer Olympics

References

Nations at the 2020 Summer Paralympics
2021 in Maldivian sport